Elbert Smith may refer to:

Elbert A. Smith (1871–1959), American leader in the Reorganized Church of Jesus Christ of Latter Day Saints
Elbert B. Smith (1920–2013), American historian and author
Elbert H. Smith, 19th-century American poet
Elbert S. Smith (1911–1983), American politician
Elbert Smith, an actor in the horror movie, The Blob or 4D Man